Acting President Kassym-Jomart Tokayev became the presidential nominee for the ruling Nur Otan on 23 April 2019. He received backing from his predecessor and the party's chairman Nursultan Nazarbayev, calling him the "worthiest candidate." On 3 May 2019, Tokayev was officially registered by the Central Election Commission and from evening 11 May, he launched his election campaign where all the platforms were announced on the website with the slogan "Игілік баршаға" (Wellbeing for all).

Programs

Platforms 
On 11 May 2019, Tokayev's campaign unveiled platforms in the official website where were divided into three sections as it follows:

Continuity 

 Public unity
 Increase in wage and quality of life
 Rigorous implementation social programs by Elbasy and their further development
 Increasing our achievements part to the economic growth

Justice 

 Supreme law and justified courts
 Public safety
 Eradication of corruption
 Effective system of social support
 High quality and general access to medicine
 Modern standardized education for all 
 Employment and creation of new jobs
 Effective government leadership

Progress 

 Dynamic economy
 Livable and modernized villages
 Successful entrepreneurship
 Effective financial system
 First-class infrastructure
 Affordable and clean ecology
 Progressiveness in Kazakhstan in modern era
 Transformation of political system
 Support for the young

Foreign policy 
As a politician, Tokayev had wide experience in foreign affairs by serving as Foreign Minister, State Secretary and the Director-General of the United Nations Office at Geneva. He announced the intention in firmly promote and defend national interests in the world arena as well as strengthen relations with every country.

He also expressed strong support for Russia, calling it a "strategic ally" where he vowed to maintain relations as Nursultan Nazarbayev did.

Economic policy 
Tokayev promised for sustainable economic growth rates for Kazakhstan's to reach into the 30 most developed countries. He also supported the taxation system to be simplified through the optimization and unification of taxes. The level of the shadow economy is planned to be reduced to the level of the OECD countries - 15-17%.

Campaign 
Tokayev visited several regions and cities in his campaign. A well-known businessman and MP of the regional mäslihat from the East Kazakhstan Region Erzhan Nurbaev urged residents of the Altai District to support the candidacy of Tokayev's in the upcoming presidential elections.

Tokayev was mocked on social media for the overuse of modification of his official photos, erasing his wrinkles and double chin.

Results 
Results of the 2019 presidential election

References 

2019 Kazakh presidential election
Tokayev
2019 Kazakh presidential campaigns